Duchesne County School District (DCSD) is a school district headquartered in Roosevelt, Utah. It serves all of Duchesne County.

By 1995 the district began using a fiber optic tele-learning system to teach foreign languages in addition to standard in-person classes, and each high school had courses in at least one foreign language.

Schools
 K-12 schools
 Tabiona School

 7-12 schools
 Altamont High School
 Duchesne High School

 High schools (9-12)
 Union High School

 Junior high schools (6-8)
 Roosevelt Junior High School
 In 1995 teachers began incorporating foreign language lessons into non-foreign language core classes.

 Elementary schools
 Altamont Elementary School (K-6)
 Centennial Elementary School (K-5)
 Duchesne Elementary School (K-6)
 East Elementary School (K-5)
 Kings Peak Elementary School (K-5)
 Myton Elementary School (K-5)
 Neola Elementary School (K-5)

 Special education
 Con Amore School (K-12) - It is a school for special education, established in 1975.

 Adult education
 District Learning Center

See also

 List of school districts in Utah

References

External links

 Duchesne County School District

Education in Duchesne County, Utah
School districts in Utah